Gad Granach (29 March 1915 – 6 January 2011) was the son of German actor Alexander Granach known for his roles in Nosferatu, Ninotchka, and For Whom the Bell Tolls. Gad Granach fled Germany at the age of 21 during the rise of Nazism, immigrating to the then-British Mandate of Palestine in 1936. He published a memoir entitled Where is Home? Stories from the Life of a German-Jewish Émigré (originally in German: Heimat los! Aus dem Leben eines jüdischen Emigranten) recounting of his early life in Berlin and subsequent life in Israel.

Literature
 Gad Granach: Where is Home? Stories from the Life of a German-Jewish Émigré, Atara Press, Los Angeles 2009, 
 Gad Granach: Heimat los! Aus dem Leben eines jüdischen Emigranten, Ölbaum-Verlag, Augsburg 1997, ; Fischer Taschenbuch Verlag, Frankfurt 2000, Random House/Bertlesmann, Munich 2008, 
 Alexander Granach: Da geht ein Mensch, Ölbaum-Verlag, Augsburg 2003, 
 Alexander Granach: "From the Shtetl to the Stage: The Odyssey of a Wandering Actor" Transaction Publishers, 2010. (New edition of "There Goes an Actor," 1945.)

Film
Israel, Why (Pourquoi Israel), directed by Claude Lanzmann, France, 1973
Granach der Jüngere, directed by Anke Apelt, Germany, 1997
Alexander Granach - Da geht ein Mensch, directed by Angelika Wittlich, Germany, 2012

Audio recordings
Ach So! Gad Granach und Henryk Broder on Tour CD, Ölbaum-Verlag, Augsburg 2000,

References

1915 births
2011 deaths
German memoirists
German male non-fiction writers
German emigrants to Mandatory Palestine